The Mosaics of Monreale Cathedral form the building's main internal feature and cover 6,500 m2. They are made of glass tesserae and were executed in Byzantine style between the late 12th and the mid-13th centuries by both local and Venetian masters. With the exception of a high dado, made of marble slabs with bands of mosaic between them, the whole interior surface of the walls, including soffits and jambs of all the arches, is covered with minute mosaic-pictures in bright colors on a gold ground. The mosaic pictures, depicting stories from both the Old and New Testament, are arranged in tiers, divided by horizontal and vertical bands. In parts of the choir there are five of these tiers of subjects or single figures one above another.

The half dome of the central apse has a colossal half-length figure of Christ, with a seated Virgin and Child below; the other apses have full-length figures of St Peter and St Paul. Inscriptions on each picture explain the subject or saint represented; these are in Latin, except some few which are in Greek. The subjects in the nave begin with scenes from the Book of Genesis, illustrating the Old Testament types of Christ and His scheme of redemption, with figures of those who prophesied and prepared for His coming. Around the lower tier and the choir are subjects from the New Testament, chiefly representing Christ's miracles and suffering, with apostles, evangelists and other saints. The design, execution and choice of subjects all appear to be of Byzantine origin, the subjects being selected from the Menologion of Basil II drawn up by the emperor Basil II in the 10th century.

By location

Inner facade

South side

Saints

North wall

Saints

East Apses

Apsidal arch

Old Testament

Creation cycle

Earthly Paradise cycle

Noah's Flood cycle

Abram cycle

New Testament

Life of Christ

Christ's Miracles (south side)

Christ's Miracles (north side)

Nativity (south side)

Passion (south side)

Saint Peter cycle

Saint Paul cycle

References

Bibliography 
 
 

Medieval art
Passion of Jesus in art
Nativity of Jesus in art
Art depicting Old Testament themes
Art depicting New Testament themes
Byzantine mosaics